Richard Tucker (1913–1975) was an American operatic tenor.

Richard Tucker may also refer to:
Richard Tucker (c.1786–after 1850), Bermudian community leader and businessman, helped free slaves from the Enterprise
Richard Tucker (wool-scourer) (1856–1922), New Zealand wool-scourer and wool-classer
Richard Hawley Tucker (1859–1952), American astronomer
Richard Tucker (actor) (1884–1942), American film actor